Chain Reaction, also known as The Strangeurs, was an American rock band from Yonkers, New York. They had two singles and were most notable for having lead singer Steven Tallarico (later known as Steven Tyler). They started off as the Strangers, until finding a group who already had that name, switching to The Strangeurs as a result. After a line-up change they changed their name to Chain Reaction.

Chain Reaction performed in concert as the opening act for such groups as The Beach Boys, The Byrds and The Yardbirds. The band's 1966 song "When I Needed You" appeared on Aerosmith's 1991 compilation box set album Pandora's Box.

Thee Strangeurs line-up
Steven Tallarico - vocals
Peter Stahl - guitar
Alan Strohmayer - bass
Don Solomon - keyboards/vocals
Barry Shapiro - drums

Chain Reaction line-up
Steve Tally (Steven Tallarico) - lead vocals, harmonica, percussion
Peter Stahl - guitar
Alan Strohmayer - bass
Don Sloan (Don Solomon) - keyboards
Barry Shore (Barry Shapiro) - drums

From Barry Shapiro (11/29/2022):  After Alan left the band, we hired Phil Salvagio as bass player.  Phil stayed with the band for about 6 months then left.  

The band then hired Marvin Pataki as lead guitarist and Peter Stahl moved over to bass.

This was the final lineup of the Chain Reaction.

Singles
"The Sun" / "When I Needed You" (B. Shapiro - S. Tallarico - D. Solomon - A. Strohmayer - P. Stahl) 1966
"You Should Have Been Here Yesterday" / "Ever Lovin' Man" (Don Sloan - Peter Stahl) 1968

See also
 Aerosmith

References

External links
http://www.rockthisway.net/chainreaction.htm
http://www.aerosmith.com/

Aerosmith
Hard rock musical groups from New York (state)